Hark Bohm (born 18 May 1939) is a German actor, screenwriter, film director, playwright and former professor for cinema studies. He was born in Hamburg-Othmarschen and grew up on the island Amrum. His younger brother was the actor Marquard Bohm, who starred in some of his early films. He is most notable for his long-time collaboration with Rainer Werner Fassbinder.

Career
His first feature film as a director was the German western Tschetan, der Indianerjunge shot in 1972 and starring his brother Marquard as well as his adopted son Dschingis Bowakow as Tschetan.

In 1978, he directed the film Moritz, Dear Moritz, which was entered into the 28th Berlin International Film Festival. Ten years later, his film Yasemin was entered into the 38th Berlin International Film Festival. In 1990, his film Herzlich willkommen was entered into the 40th Berlin International Film Festival. In 1997, he was a member of the jury at the 47th Berlin International Film Festival.

Selected filmography

As actor

 Red Sun (1970) - Linker Student
 The American Soldier (1970) - Doc
 Der große Verhau (1971) - Oberst von Schaacke
  (1972, TV Movie) - Chief Admiral of the 6th Fleet
 The Merchant of Four Seasons (1972) - Chief Policeman
 Liebe, so schön wie Liebe (1972)
 Ali: Fear Eats the Soul (1974) - Doctor
 Effie Briest (1974) - Apotheker Gieshübler (uncredited)
 Fox and His Friends (1975) - Policeman Müller (uncredited)
  (1976)
  (1976) - Syndikatssekretär
 Adolf and Marlene (1977)
 Moritz, Dear Moritz (1978) - Arzt
 Despair (1978) - Doctor
 Der kleine Godard an das Kuratorium junger deutscher Film (1978) - First Director
 The Marriage of Maria Braun (1979) - Senkenberg
 It Can Only Get Worse (1979)
 The Third Generation (1979) - Gerhard Gast
 1+1=3 [de] (1979) - Lawyer
 Panic Time (1980) - Peitschenperverser Dr. Gerhard Kühn
  (1980) - TV-Moderator
 Berlin Alexanderplatz (1980, TV Mini-Series) - Otto Lüders
 Lili Marleen (1980) - Taschner
 Lola (1981) - Völker
 Alles unter Kontrolle. Notizen auf dem Weg zum Überwachungsstaat (1963)
 Love Is the Beginning of All Terror (1984) - Torsten
 Power of Evil (1985) - Notar
 Nicht nichts ohne Dich (1985) - Architekturprofessor
 Das Go! Projekt (1986, TV Movie) - Professor Oppenheimer
  (1987) - Staatsanwalt König
 Fucking Fernand (1987) - Von Schaltz
 Ossegg oder Die Wahrheit über Hänsel und Gretel (1987) - Petschau-Hartlieb
 Linie 1 (1988) - Er
 Treffen in Travers (1988) - Bürgermeister
  (1989) - 1. Stammgast
 Das Spinnennetz (1989) - Dada-Künstler
 Adrian und die Römer (1989) - Augenarzt
 Erdenschwer (1989) - Chefarzt
 Herzlich willkommen (1990) - Direktor Dr. Fischer
 Lost in Siberia (1991) - Max Brunovich
 Schtonk! (1992) - Catholic pastor
 Ruby Cairo (1992) - German (uncredited)
 Madregilda (1993) - Alvariño
 Justice (1993) - Prof. Winter
 The Promise (1994) - Müller II
 Underground (1995) - Dr. Strasse
 Conversation with the Beast (1996) - Dr. Hassler
 Für immer und immer (1997) - Richter
 Knockin' on Heaven's Door (1997) - Polizeipsychologe
 Der Hauptmann von Köpenick (1997, TV Movie) - Kriminalinspektor Schmude
 Härtetest (1998) - Psychiater Dr. Bohm
 'Ne günstige Gelegenheit (1999) - Dobisch
 Invincible (2001) - Judge
 Falcons (2002) - A Man of the World
 True North (2006) - Pol
 Underdog (2007) - Herr Wache
  (2008, TV film) - Heinrich Brenner
 Was wenn der Tod uns scheidet? (2008) - Busfahrer
  (2008) - Roth
 If Not Us, Who? (2011) - Kritiker
 Warum? (2018) - Friedrich Zeidler
 The Golden Glove (2019) - Dornkaat-Max

As director
 Einer wird verletzt, träumt, stirbt und wird vergessen (1971, short)
  (1972)
 Wir pfeifen auf den Gurkenkönig (1974–76, TV)
  (1975/76)
 Moritz, Dear Moritz (1978)
 Im Herzen des Hurrican (1979/80)
  (1983)
 Wie ein freier Vogel – Como un parajo libre (1985, documentary)
  (1987)
 Yasemin (1988)
 Herzlich willkommen (1990)
 Für immer und immer (1996)
 Vera Brühne (2000/01, TV miniseries)
 Sterne, die nie untergehen / Atlantic Affairs (2002, TV film)
 Goodbye Berlin (2016, only screenplay)

References

External links
 

1939 births
Living people
German male film actors
20th-century German male actors
21st-century German male actors
Male actors from Hamburg
People from Altona, Hamburg
Film directors from Hamburg